Marine Wing Support Squadron 371 (MWSS 371) is an aviation ground support unit of the United States Marine Corps. They are based out of Marine Corps Air Station Yuma, Arizona. The squadron is part of Marine Air Control Group 38 and the 3rd Marine Aircraft Wing.

Mission
Provide all essential Aviation Ground Support requirements to a designated fixed-wing component of an Aviation Combat Element (ACE) and all supporting or attached elements of the Marine Air Control Group.

History
Marine Wing Support Squadron 371 was activated on 2 June 1986 at Marine Corps Air Station El Toro, California. They relocated during April 1987 to MCAS Yuma, Arizona. The squadrons first combat deployment was in support of Operation Desert Storm in Southwest Asia from August 1990 to April 1991. Elements of MWSS-371 have also participated in Operation Restore Hope in Somalia from January to May 1993 and Operation Southern Watch over Iraq from March to June 2001. They also deployed for Operation Iraqi Freedom in 2003, 2005, 2007 and to Afghanistan in support of Operation Enduring Freedom in 2009.

See also

 United States Marine Corps Aviation
 Organization of the United States Marine Corps
 List of United States Marine Corps aviation support units

References

External links
 

MWSS371